Southern High School Magnet Career Academy (MCA) was built in 1951, and the first graduating class was in 1952. All students had transferred from the recently closed Okolona High School, which became Okolona Elementary School. Its mission is to prepare students to be "productive members of a technologically advanced society."

Unlike in many high schools, students eventually choose a "major," including business technology, telecommunications, machine tool and die technology, and transportation technology.

Starting in the 2011–12 school year, the "Freshman Academy", which is devoted to help freshmen adjust to high school, was opened. Freshmen do not have their own lunch. However, they have taken a part of the 3rd and 2nd floor to be used as the Freshman Academy area.

Starting in the 2011–2012 school year, with the new principal came a change known as "Southern 3.0 Upgrade", in which the school has become more involved and more rigorous with learning.

Notable alumni

 Lisa Harrison (1989) – athlete; former WNBA player; 1989 Naismith Prep Player of the Year
 Hoot Hester (1969) – musician; fiddler for the Grand Ole Opry
 William R. Higgins – Marine colonel; served in the Vietnam War, and was captured and later murdered while serving on a United Nations peacekeeping mission in Lebanon
 Rebecca Jackson – politician; former Jefferson County Judge/Executive
 Phil Simms (1974) – sportscaster; former NFL quarterback; two-time Super Bowl champion
 Terrence W. Wilcutt (1967) – astronaut; space shuttle pilot and mission commander
 Deon Yelder (2020) athlete, NFL Tight-End; Kansas City Chiefs

See also
 Public schools in Louisville, Kentucky

External links
 Southern High School Magnet Career Academy

References

Jefferson County Public Schools (Kentucky)
Educational institutions established in 1951
Public high schools in Kentucky
1951 establishments in Kentucky
High schools in Louisville, Kentucky